N-terminal acetyltransferase B complex catalytic subunit NAT5 is an enzyme that in humans is encoded by the NAT5 gene.

References

Further reading

Human proteins